John Diefenbaker Senior School is a secondary school located in Hanover, Ontario, Canada. It is named after John Diefenbaker, a Prime Minister who was born in Neustadt. The school is part of the Bluewater District School Board.

Mascot - Trojan

School Colours - Purple and White

JDSS instrumental bands have travelled the world capturing numerous medals in competition.

In 1985 the JDSS Trojans captured the Grey County Football Championship.

In 1997 the JDSS Trojans defeated the OSCVI Falcons to capture the Grey Country Football Championship.

Notable alumni
Daryl Shane, curler
 Jamie Warren, country music singer

See also
List of high schools in Ontario

References

Educational institutions in Canada with year of establishment missing
High schools in Ontario
Schools in Grey County